Aromalunni is a 1975 Indian Malayalam-language film, directed and produced by Kunchacko, based on Vadakkan Pattukal, a collection of Northern Ballads of medieval origin. The film stars Prem Nazir, Vijayasree, Ravichandran and Sheela in the lead roles. The film had musical score by G. Devarajan. The film is a sequel to the 1966 film Unniyarcha. This film was a huge commercial success.

Cast

Prem Nazir as Aromalunni/Kunjiraman
Ravichandran as Thankhappan chekavar/Chandrappan
Vijayasree as Kanni
Sheela as Maakkam
K. P. Ummer as Thampikkutti
Ragini as Unniyarcha
Kaviyoor Ponnamma as Thumbolarcha
Sathyan as Aromalchekavar
Thikkurissy Sukumaran Nair as Puthooram Veettil Kannappa Chekavar
N. Govindan Kutty
Manavalan Joseph
Adoor Pankajam
Alummoodan
G. K. Pillai
Kaduvakulam Antony
Paravoor Bharathan as Thirumeni
S. P. Pillai as Paanan

Soundtrack
The music was composed by G. Devarajan and the lyrics were written by Vayalar Ramavarma.

References

External links
 

1972 films
1970s Malayalam-language films
Films directed by Kunchacko
Kalarippayattu films